The 2007 Spanish local elections were held on Sunday, 27 May 2007, to elect all 66,131 councillors in the 8,111 municipalities of Spain and all 1,038 seats in 38 provincial deputations. The elections were held simultaneously with regional elections in thirteen autonomous communities, as well as local elections in the three foral deputations of the Basque Country and the eleven island councils in the Balearic and Canary Islands.

The results saw few changes overall; most incumbent governments retained their majority, with only a few exceptions. The PP government in the Balearics fell, and a coalition led by PSOE took power.  While the elections were seen as a first indication of how the 2008 Spanish general election might turn out, the results proved to be inconclusive. In 2003, the PSOE had a slight edge with 34.8 against the PP's 34.3; in this election, the PP had 35.6 to the PSOE's 34.9. Turnout was slightly lower, with 63.8 instead of 67.7 four years earlier.

Electoral system
Municipal elections
Municipalities in Spain were local corporations with independent legal personality. They had a governing body, the municipal council or corporation, composed of the mayor, the government council and the elected plenary assembly. Elections to the local councils in Spain were fixed for the fourth Sunday of May every four years.

Voting for the local assemblies was on the basis of universal suffrage, which comprised all nationals over eighteen, registered and residing in the corresponding municipality and in full enjoyment of their political rights, as well as resident non-national European citizens and those whose country of origin allowed Spanish nationals to vote in their own elections by virtue of a treaty. Local councillors were elected using the D'Hondt method and a closed list proportional representation, with an electoral threshold of five percent of valid votes—which included blank ballots—being applied in each local council. Parties not reaching the threshold were not taken into consideration for seat distribution. Councillors were allocated to municipal councils based on the following scale:

Councillors of municipalities with populations between 100 and 250 inhabitants were elected under an open list partial block voting, with electors voting for individual candidates instead of parties and for up to four candidates. Additionally, in municipalities with populations below 100 inhabitants, as well as for those that made it advisable as a result of their geographical location or the convenience of a better management of municipal interests or other circumstances, were to be organized through the open council system, in which voters would directly elect the local major.

The mayor was indirectly elected by the plenary assembly. A legal clause required that mayoral candidates earn the vote of an absolute majority of councillors, or else the candidate of the most-voted party in the assembly was to be automatically appointed to the post. In the event of a tie, a toss-up would determine the appointee.

The electoral law allowed for parties and federations registered in the interior ministry, coalitions and groupings of electors to present lists of candidates. Parties and federations intending to form a coalition ahead of an election were required to inform the relevant Electoral Commission within ten days of the election call, whereas groupings of electors needed to secure the signature of a determined amount of the electors registered in the municipality for which they sought election:

At least one percent of the electors in municipalities with a population below 5,000 inhabitants, provided that the number of signers was more than double that of councillors at stake.
At least 100 signatures in municipalities with a population between 5,001 and 10,000.
At least 500 signatures in municipalities with a population between 10,001 and 50,000.
At least 1,500 signatures in municipalities with a population between 50,001 and 150,000.
At least 3,000 signatures in municipalities with a population between 150,001 and 300,000.
At least 5,000 signatures in municipalities with a population between 300,001 and 1,000,000.
At least 8,000 signatures in municipalities with a population over 1,000,001.

Electors were disallowed from signing for more than one list of candidates.

Deputations and island councils
Provincial deputations were the governing bodies of provinces in Spain, having an administration role of municipal activities and composed of a provincial president, an administrative body, and a plenary. Basque provinces had foral deputations instead—called Juntas Generales—, whereas deputations for single-province autonomous communities were abolished: their functions transferred to the corresponding regional parliaments. For insular provinces, such as the Balearic and Canary Islands, deputations were replaced by island councils in each of the islands or group of islands. For Majorca, Menorca, Ibiza and Formentera this figure was referred to in Spanish as consejo insular, whereas for Gran Canaria, Tenerife, Fuerteventura, La Gomera, El Hierro, Lanzarote and La Palma its name was cabildo insular.

Most deputations were indirectly elected by local councillors from municipalities in each judicial district. Seats were allocated to provincial deputations based on the following scale:

Island councils and foral deputations were elected directly by electors under their own, specific electoral regulations.

Opinion polls

Municipal elections

Overall

City control
The following table lists party control in provincial capitals, as well as in municipalities above or around 75,000. Gains for a party are highlighted in that party's colour.

Provincial deputations

Summary

Deputation control
The following table lists party control in provincial deputations. Gains for a party are highlighted in that party's colour.

Notes

References
Opinion poll sources

Other

2007